Abelhak Saihi is the Algerian Minister of Health, Population and Hospital Reform. He was appointed as minister on 9 September 2022.

References

External links 

 Ministry of Health, Population and Hospital Reform

Living people
21st-century Algerian politicians
Algerian politicians
Health ministers of Algeria
Government ministers of Algeria
Year of birth missing (living people)